was a Japanese botanist and pteridologist. He spent most of his academic career at Yokohama National University.

In 1986, a Russian botanist Michael Georgievich Pimenov published a genus of flowering plants, from central Asia, belonging to the family Apiaceae, as Kitagawia in his honour.

References

20th-century Japanese botanists
1910 births
1995 deaths
Academic staff of Yokohama National University